Jaypee University of Information Technology (also J. P. University of Information Technology and JUIT) is a private university in Waknaghat, Solan, Himachal Pradesh, India.

History
Jaypee University of Information Technology is recognised by the state government of Himachal Pradesh, India. It was set up by Act No. 14 of 2002 vide Extraordinary Gazette notification of Government of Himachal Pradesh dated 23 May 2002. JUIT was approved by the University Grants Commission under section 2(f) of the UGC Act, the University commenced academic activities from July 2002.

Location
The university is located 4 kilometers off National Highway 22 (22 km from Shimla) (from Waknaghat) which runs from Kalka to Shimla (India).

The nearest railway station is Kaithleeghat, 4 kilometers from Waknaghat and the nearest airport is Shimla.

Academics

The university offers Bachelor of Technology programmes in various fields. It also offers Bachelor of Pharmacy and Master of Pharmacy as well as various doctoral programmes. In addition to the above-mentioned programs, a dual degree program is offered, wherein a student spends four years at JUIT attending aforementioned programs and one year of the MBA program at the Jaypee Business School, Jaypee Institute of Information Technology.

Rankings

Jaypee University of Information Technology was ranked 138 among engineering colleges by the National Institutional Ranking Framework (NIRF) in 2022.</ref>

Departments
The university includes the following departments:
 Department of Computer Science Engineering and IT
 Department of Electronics and Communication Technology
 Department of Civil Engineering
 Department of Biotechnology and Bioinformatics
 Department of Physics and Material Sciences
 Department of Mathematics

Department of Pharmacy
The JUIT Department of Pharmacy was approved by the Pharmacy Council of India (PCI) for BPharma from 2008.

See also
Jaypee University of Engineering and Technology.
Jaypee institute of information technology.

References

External links

Universities in Himachal Pradesh
All India Council for Technical Education
Information technology institutes
Jaypee Group
Engineering colleges in Himachal Pradesh
Education in Solan district
Educational institutions established in 2002
2002 establishments in Himachal Pradesh